The first USS Hurst (SP-3196) was a United States Navy patrol vessel in commission from 1918 to 1919.

Hurst was built in 1918 as a private motorboat by W. F. Dunn at Norfolk, Virginia. On 22 or 23 August 1918, the U.S. Navy acquired her from her owner, T. C. Hurst of Norfolk, for use as a section patrol boat during World War I. She was commissioned the same day as USS Hurst (SP-3196).

Assigned to the 5th Naval District, Hurst served as a transportation and dispatch boat in the Hampton Roads, Virginia, area for the District Supervisor, Naval Overseas Transportation Service, until she was transferred to the United States Public Health Service on 15 November 1919.

Notes

References

Department of the Navy Naval History and Heritage Command Online Library of Selected Images: Civilian Ships: Motor Boat Hurst (1918); Later USS Hurst (SP-3156), 1918-1919
NavSource Online: Section Patrol Craft Photo Archive Hurst (SP 3196)

Patrol vessels of the United States Navy
World War I patrol vessels of the United States
Ships built in Norfolk, Virginia
1918 ships